Mastodon Township is a civil township of Iron County in the U.S. state of Michigan.  As of the 2000 census, the township population was 668.

Mastodon was so named from the fact mastodon bones were discovered when sinking a mine shaft.

Mastodon may have also been named for the size of the large, iron ore body which was struck at the mine site; as "Mastodon" at that time, being a relatively new discovery, was also being used as a slang adjective, meaning large/huge.

Communities
The village of Alpha is within the township.

Geography
The Brule River forms the southern boundary of the township, with the Town of Florence in Florence County, Wisconsin on the other side of the river.

Demographics
As of the census of 2000, there were 668 people, 314 households, and 205 families residing in the township.  The population density was 5.3 per square mile (2.0/km2).  There were 689 housing units at an average density of 5.4 per square mile (2.1/km2).  The racial makeup of the township was 99.40% White, 0.30% from other races, and 0.30% from two or more races. Hispanic or Latino of any race were 0.60% of the population. 21.3% were of Polish, 20.8% German, 14.7% Finnish, 6.9% Swedish, 5.9% English, 5.9% Italian and 5.1% Irish ancestry according to Census 2000.

There were 314 households, out of which 18.5% had children under the age of 18 living with them, 56.7% were married couples living together, 3.5% had a female householder with no husband present, and 34.7% were non-families. 30.9% of all households were made up of individuals, and 17.5% had someone living alone who was 65 years of age or older.  The average household size was 2.13 and the average family size was 2.60.

In the township the population was spread out, with 17.4% under the age of 18, 4.9% from 18 to 24, 19.8% from 25 to 44, 31.9% from 45 to 64, and 26.0% who were 65 years of age or older.  The median age was 50 years. For every 100 females, there were 108.8 males.  For every 100 females age 18 and over, there were 106.7 males.

The median income for a household in the township was $27,917, and the median income for a family was $39,231. Males had a median income of $26,667 versus $23,125 for females. The per capita income for the township was $16,823.  About 6.3% of families and 13.2% of the population were below the poverty line, including 22.5% of those under age 18 and 6.3% of those age 65 or over.

References

Townships in Iron County, Michigan
Townships in Michigan